The European wildcat (Felis silvestris) is a small wildcat species native to continental Europe, Scotland, Turkey and the Caucasus. It inhabits forests from the Iberian Peninsula, Italy, Central and Eastern Europe to the Caucasus. Its fur is brownish to grey with stripes on the forehead and on the sides and has a bushy tail with a black tip.

In France and Italy, the European wildcat is predominantly nocturnal, but also active in the daytime when undisturbed by human activities. It preys foremost on small mammals such as lagomorphs and rodents, but also on ground-dwelling birds.

Taxonomy

Felis (catus) silvestris was the scientific name proposed in 1778 by Johann von Schreber when he described a wild cat based on texts from the early 18th century and before.
In the 19th and 20th centuries, several wildcat type specimens were described and proposed as subspecies, including:
Felis silvestris caucasica proposed by Konstantin Satunin in 1905 was a skin of a female cat collected near Borjomi in Georgia.
Felis grampia proposed by Gerrit Smith Miller Jr. in 1907 was a skin and a skull of a male wildcat from Invermoriston in Scotland. Miller revised his classification in 1912, proposing Felis silvestris grampia after reviewing more wildcat skins from Scotland.
Felis tartessia also proposed by Miller in 1907 was a skin and a skull of a male wildcat from Jerez de la Frontera in southern Spain. The wildcats north of the Douro and Ebro Rivers are said to be smaller than in the rest of the region. The disputed "Tartessian" wildcat has kept the same size and proportions as the form that was found in mainland Europe during the Pleistocene Ice Ages.

As of 2017, two subspecies are recognised as valid taxa:
F. s. silvestris in continental Europe, Scotland and Sicily
F. s. caucasica in Turkey and the Caucasus.

Zoological specimens of cats that originated on Mediterranean islands are not considered native but introduced, including:
Felis lybica var sarda proposed in 1885 by Fernand Lataste was a skin and a skull of a male cat from Sarrabus in Sardinia.
Felis reyi proposed in 1929 by Louis Lavauden who described a skin and a skull of a specimen from Biguglia.
F. s. cretensis proposed in 1953 by Theodor Haltenorth who described two cat skins that were purchased in a bazaar in Chania.

Phylogeny

Both models agree in the jungle cat (F. chaus) having been the first Felis species that diverged, followed by the black-footed cat (F. nigripes), the sand cat (F. margarita), the African wildcat (F. lybica) and then the European wildcat.

Characteristics 

The European wildcat's fur varies in colour from brownish to grey with paler contour hairs. It has five stripes on the forehead, which are broken up into small spots. A dark stripe behind the shoulders expands into a spinal stripe running up to the base of the tail. On the sides, it has irregular dark stripes, which break up on the hind legs, thus forming a blotched pattern. Its tail is bushy with two to three black, transverse rings and rounded at the black tip.

The top of the head and the forehead bear four well-developed dark bands that split into small spots. Two short and narrow stripes are usually present in the shoulder region, in front of the dorsal band. Some individuals have a few light spots on the throat, between the forelegs, or in the inguinal region. The dorsal surface of the neck and head are the same colour as that of the trunk, but is lighter grey around the eyes, lips, cheeks, and chin. A slight ochreous shade is visible on the undersides of the flanks.

A black and narrow dorsal band starts on the shoulders, and runs along the back up to the base of the tail. In some animals, the summer coat is ashen coloured. The patterns on the head and neck are as well-developed as those on the tail, though the patterns on the flanks are almost imperceptible. Guard hairs measure , the tip hairs , and the underfur .

They also have a less diffuse stripe pattern, proportionally larger teeth, and feed more often on rabbits than the wildcats north of the Douro-Ebro, which are more dependent on small rodents.

The European wildcat is on average bigger and stouter than the domestic cat, has longer fur and a shorter non-tapering bushy tail. It has striped fur and a dark dorsal band.

European wildcats have proportionately shorter cheek tooth rows with smaller teeth, but a broader muzzle than African wildcats.
Since European wildcats and domestic cats opportunistically interbreed, it is difficult to distinguish wildcats and striped hybrids correctly on the basis of only morphological characteristics.

Distribution and habitat

The European wildcat lives primarily in broad-leaved and mixed forests. It avoids intensively cultivated areas and settlements.
The northernmost population lives in northern and eastern Scotland. It has been extirpated in England and Wales.

There are two disconnected populations in France. The one in the Ardennes in the country's north-east extends to Luxembourg, Germany and Belgium. The other in southern France may be connected via the Pyrenees to populations in Spain and Portugal.

In the Netherlands, European wildcats were recorded in 1999 near Nijmegen and in 2004 in North Brabant; these individuals had possibly dispersed from Germany. In Germany, the Rhine is a major barrier between the population in Eifel and Hunsrück mountains west of the river and populations east of the river, where a six-lane highway hampers dispersal.

In Switzerland, European wildcats are present in the Jura Mountains.
Three fragmented populations in Italy comprise one in the country's central and southern part, one in the eastern Alps that may be connected to populations in Slovenia and Croatia. The Sicilian population is the only Mediterranean insular population that has not been introduced.

The population in the Polish Carpathian Mountains extends to northern Slovakia and western Ukraine.

Behaviour and ecology
In France and Italy, the European wildcat is active foremost at night; in undisturbed sites, it is also active by day.

In Sicily, an individual was photographed in 2009 and again in 2018 at about the same location. It was probably at least 10 years old at the time of recapture.

Hunting and diet
In Western Europe, the wildcat feeds on hamsters, brown rats, dormice, water voles, voles, and wood mice. From time to time, it also preys on small carnivores like martens, European polecat, stoat, and least weasel (Mustela nivalis), as well as fawns of red deer (Cervus elaphus), roe deer (Capreolus capreolus), and chamois (Rupicapra rupicapra). In the Carpathians, the wildcat feeds primarily on yellow-necked mouse (Apodemus flavicollis), northern red-backed vole (Myodes rutilus), Tatra pine vole (Microtus tatricus), and occasionally also European hare (Lepus europaeus). In Transcarpathia, the wildcat's diet consists of mouse-like rodents, galliformes, and squirrels. In the Dnestr swamps, it preys on Microtus, water voles, and birds, while those living in the Prut swamps primarily target water vole, brown rat, and muskrat (Ondatra zibethicus). Birds taken by Prut wildcats include warblers, ferruginous duck, Eurasian coot, spotted crake, and gadwall. In Moldavia, the wildcat's winter diet consists primarily of rodents, while it preys on birds, fish, and crayfish in summer. Brown rats and water voles, as well as muskrats and waterfowl are the main sources of food for wildcats in the Kuban River delta. Wildcats in the northern Caucasus feed on mouse-like rodents and edible dormice, as well as birds, young chamois and roe deer on rare occasions. Wildcats on the Black Sea coast are thought to feed on small birds, shrews, and hares. On one occasion, the feathers of a white-tailed eagle and the skull of a kid were found at a den site. In Transcaucasia, the wildcat's diet consists of gerbils, voles, birds, and reptiles in the summer, and birds, mouse-like rodents, and hares in winter.

The Scottish wildcat mainly preys on European rabbit (Oryctolagus cuniculus), field vole (Microtus agrestis), bank vole (Myodes glareolus), wood mouse (Apodemus sylvaticus), and birds.

Threats
In most European countries, European wildcats have become rare. Although legally protected, they are still shot by people mistaking them for feral cats. In the Scottish Highlands, where approximately 400 were thought to remain in the wild in 2004, interbreeding with feral cats is a significant threat to the wild population's distinctiveness. The population in Portugal and Spain is also threatened by interbreeding with feral cats and loss of habitat. The extent of hybridization is low in Germany, Italy and Luxembourg. In the 1990s, the easternmost population in Ukraine, Moldova, and the Caucasus was threatened by destruction of broad-leaved forests, entailing a reduction of their range. Only small numbers occur in protected areas.

Conservation efforts

The European wildcat is protected in most European range countries. It is listed in CITES Appendix II, in Appendix II of the Berne Convention on the Conservation of European Wildlife and Natural Habitats and in the European Union's Habitats and Species Directive.

Germany 
In 2004, the Friends of the Earth Germany initiated the project "Safety Net for the European Wildcat".
An Action Plan for the Protection of the European Wildcat in Germany was developed in 2009, aiming at doubling the area inhabited by European wildcat and linking populations within Germany and with neighbouring countries until 2019.

Scotland 

In 2013, the Scottish Wildcat Conservation Action Group developed the Scottish Wildcat Conservation Action Plan. With this plan, the group set national action priorities and defined responsibilities of agencies and funding priorities for conservation efforts between 2013 and 2019. Its implementation is coordinated by Scottish Natural Heritage. However, the population has been deemed no longer viable.

England 
In 2023, it was announced that wildcats would be reintroduced in Devon and Cornwall for the first time in 500 years as part of a conservation project.

In captivity
The European wildcat has the reputation for being effectively impossible to raise as a pet. Naturalist Frances Pitt wrote "there was a time when I did not believe this ... my optimism was daunted" by trying to keep a wildcat she named Beelzebina.

In England, conservationists plan to start a captive breeding programme in 2019 with the aim to reintroduce cats into the wild by 2022.

References

External links

Felis
Wildcats
Mammals described in 1777
Fauna of Albania
Felids of Europe